Thomas Jok Deng (born 20 March 1997) is an Australian professional footballer who plays as a central defender for Japanese club Albirex Niigata. Born a South Sudanese refugee in Kenya, he has represented the Australia national team.

Personal life
Thomas Jok Deng was born on 20 March 1997 into a family of South Sudanese refugees in Nairobi, Kenya. He, along with his family, were fleeing from the conflict in South Sudan and eventually resettled in Adelaide, South Australia, in 2003, when Deng was six years old.

Deng has four older siblings, as well as a half-brother who lives in Uganda. His older brother, Peter Deng, has represented South Sudan at senior level.

Club career
Deng's first club, along with his good friend and fellow refugee and Socceroo Awer Mabil, was the Adelaide Blue Eagles.

After the family had moved to Melbourne in 2011, Deng made his senior football debut as a 16 year old in 2013 at Western Eagles F.C. under then-manager Budala Barešić-Nikić in the Victorian State League Division 3.
The following season, the youngster moved to nearby Green Gully SC, where manager Bob Stojcevski recruited Deng to play for the club's u20 side. He was eventually promoted to the senior team and made 13 first team appearances in the NPL Victoria in 2014.

Following his impressive performances at Gully, Melbourne Victory National Youth League coach Darren Davies rewarded Deng with a youth contract. Deng debuted for the senior team for Melbourne Victory against Balmain Tigers in the 2015 FFA Cup. He made his A-League debut on 9 October 2015 against Adelaide United, as a substitute replacing Fahid Ben Khalfallah after a red card was shown to Leigh Broxham. Thomas made his starting debut in the A-League for Melbourne Victory on 17 October 2015 in round 2 against town rivals, Melbourne City, where he was selected as Man of the Match by supporters and social media.

In June 2016, Deng moved to Jong PSV on a one-year loan deal. After making five appearances, he returned to Melbourne Victory at the end of the season.

In January 2020, Deng left Melbourne Victory to join Japanese club Urawa Red Diamonds following his performance at the 2020 AFC U-23 Championship.

International career
He was part of the main squad of the Olyroos at the 2016 AFC U-23 Championship and put on an extremely impressive display throughout the tournament, garnering high praise from respected Australian pundits: Geoff Fullgrabe, Alan Vucenik, and Craig Foster.

Due to being born in Kenya and having South Sudanese heritage, he is eligible to play for Australia, Kenya and South Sudan.

In October 2018, Deng was named in the Socceroos squad for their training camp in the UAE and their friendly against Kuwait. In the friendly he made his debut, together with fellow South Sudanese refugee and boyhood friend Awer Mabil.

On 22 July 2021, Deng captained Australia in a historic 2–0 win over Argentina in the first group game of the 2020 Summer Olympics in Tokyo, also winning the Player of the Match award.

Honours
Melbourne Victory
 A-League Championship: 2017–18
 FFA Cup: 2015

Albirex Niigata
J2 League: 2022

References

Further reading

External links
 

Profile at Albirex Niigata

1993 births
Living people
Soccer players from Melbourne
Australian soccer players
Australia youth international soccer players
Australian people of South Sudanese descent
Sportspeople of South Sudanese descent
Sudanese emigrants to Australia
Association football defenders
Melbourne Victory FC players
Jong PSV players
Urawa Red Diamonds players
Albirex Niigata players
National Premier Leagues players
A-League Men players
Eerste Divisie players
J2 League players
Western Eagles FC players
Australia international soccer players
Footballers at the 2020 Summer Olympics
Olympic soccer players of Australia
2022 FIFA World Cup players